Don't Say No may refer to:
 Don't Say No (Billy Squier album), a 1981 album by American rock singer Billy Squier, and its title track
 Don't Say No (Seohyun EP), a 2016 extended play by South Korean pop singer Seohyun, and its title track
 "Don't Say No" (Tom Tom Club song), from the 1988 album Boom Boom Chi Boom Boom
 "Don't Say No", by Robbie Williams from the 2005 album Intensive Care

See also
 "Don't Say No Tonight", a 1985 single by Eugene Wilde